Gerardus ("Gerrie") Dominicus Hyacinthus Maria Mühren (2 February 1946 – 19 September 2013) was a Dutch footballer who played as a midfielder. He was the older brother of Arnold Mühren, who likewise played for the Netherlands national team.

Club career
Born in Volendam, North Holland, Mühren started his career at FC Volendam, before moving to play for Ajax between 1968 and 1976. Whilst at Ajax he won three European Cup winners medals. He also scored in back-to-back KNVB Cup final wins for Ajax in 1971 and 1972. He scored Ajax' 1000th Eredivisie goal against Telstar and the winning goal of the 1972–73 European Cup semi-final second leg against Real Madrid.

He later played for Real Betis in Spain, and Seiko in Hong Kong. Whilst he was at Betis they won the 1977 Copa del Rey but he was denied a winners' medal, for foreigners were not allowed to play in the cup competition.

In 1983, he won the Dutch Eerste Divisie title with DS '79, but the club was relegated from the Eredivisie the next year, which prompted him to return for a final season to Volendam.

International career
Mühren was capped by the Netherlands national team on ten occasions, his first cap coming against England in November 1969, and his last against Belgium in November 1973.

Retirement and death
After retiring as a player he worked as a scout for Ajax. He died of Myelodysplastic syndrome, aged 67, in his home town of Volendam.

Honours
Volendam
 Eerste Divisie: 1966–67

Ajax
 Eredivisie: 1969–70, 1971–72, 1972–73
 KNVB Cup: 1969–70, 1970–71, 1971–72
 European Cup: 1970–71, 1971–72, 1972–73
 European Super Cup: 1972, 1973
 Intercontinental Cup: 1972

Dordrecht
 Eerste Divisie: 1982–83

Seiko
 Hong Kong First Division League: 1981–82, 1982–83

References

External links

 Voetbal International Database
 
 

1946 births
2013 deaths
Deaths from myelodysplastic syndrome
People from Volendam
Association football midfielders
Dutch footballers
Netherlands international footballers
FC Volendam players
AFC Ajax players
Real Betis players
MVV Maastricht players
Seiko SA players
FC Dordrecht players
Dutch expatriate footballers
Eredivisie players
Eerste Divisie players
La Liga players
Hong Kong First Division League players
Expatriate footballers in Spain
Expatriate footballers in Hong Kong
Dutch expatriate sportspeople in Hong Kong
Dutch expatriate sportspeople in Spain
Deaths from blood disease
UEFA Champions League winning players
Footballers from North Holland